The Lombo language (also called Olombo, Turumbu, Ulumbu) is in the Kele language group of Bantu languages. It is spoken by the Turumbu people of the Tshopo District, Isangi Territory, in the Democratic Republic of the Congo.

References

Soko-Kele languages
Languages of the Democratic Republic of the Congo